Double Exposure is a vocal jazz album by John Pizzarelli, released in 2012 with Telarc. It consists of tributes to Pizzarelli's favorite songs from his adolescence, framed in traditional jazz arrangements.

Track listing

Personnel

Musicians
 John Pizzarelli7-string guitar, guitar (classical), primary artist, vocals
 Tony Kadleckflugelhorn, trumpet
 John Moscaeuphonium, trombone
 Kenny Bergerclarinet (bass), saxophone (baritone)
 Andy Fuscoclarinet, saxophone (alto), saxophone (tenor)
 Aaron Weinsteinviolin
 Larry Fullerpiano, piano (electric)
 Larry Goldingsorgan
 Martin Pizzarellibass
 Tony Tedescodrums
 Jessica Molaskey vocals

Support
 John Pizzarelliliner notes, mastering, mixing, producer
 Larissa Collinsart direction
 Bill Mossengineer, mastering, mixing
 Albert J. Romancover design, package design
 Thom O'Connorassistant engineer

Reception

Reception to the album was generally positive.

Dave Gelly for The Guardian summarised "[t]he arrangements are sharp and witty, the singing deceptively easygoing, and the guitar playing just terrific. It's a delight."

Rick Anderson commented for AllMusic that "[w]hat's charming about this album, beyond the sheer quality of the songs and the arrangements, is Pizzarelli's obvious and genuine love for this really broad gamut of material, and his insight into the varied qualities that make them all great songs."

Will Layman's review for the PopMatters magazine was more mixed, commenting "[t]he delightful singer and guitarist plays pop/rock material in his jazz style, managing a couple of miracles and few real misses."

And for the Boston Globe, Steve Greenlee wrote "[i]f you like Pizzarelli, you'll enjoy this immensely. If, however, you find his voice too thin and nasally, then “Double Exposure” won't win you over."

References

External links
 
 

2012 albums
John Pizzarelli albums
Vocal jazz albums
Telarc Records albums